Touché Restaurant and Bar, or simply Touché, was an Italian restaurant in Portland, Oregon's Pearl District, in the United States. Established by Frank Ernandes in 1995, the restaurant was housed in a former fire station and became known for its wood-fired pizzas and pasta. In 2016, plans emerged for a developer to replace the building, along with others, to build a new 12-story apartment building. Touché closed in May 2017.

Description and history

Touché was an Italian restaurant with an upstairs billiards hall, established in 1995 by Frank Ernandes. It was housed in a former fire station, built in 1913, and located on a 5,000-square-foot lot at the intersection of Northwest 14th Avenue and Glisan Street. The restaurant became known for its wood-fired pizzas and pasta entrees.

The firehouse was listed on the City of Portland's Historic Resource Inventory for its 20th-century Italian Renaissance architecture and historic importance. According to the Historic Resource Inventory, the building was designed for Engine and Truck Company #3 and was "one of four stations of similar design erected on the west side, all designed by Battalion Chief Lee Holden, father of the gas-driven fire boat. This station was originally designed for horse-drawn apparatus and was remodeled later to accommodate mechanized fire equipment." In 1967, the station was sold and the building served as a warehouse and freight outlet. Portland's first restaurant to serve wood-fired Italian pizzas, Perlina, opened in the building in 1992, and was replaced by Touché in 1995. Robert Ames and James Puckett owned the building, as of 2016.

In April 2016, Touché's general manager confirmed a developer's plans to demolish the former firehouse, along with two neighboring restaurants, and construct a 12-story apartment building in its place. In an online post, the restaurant's staff confirmed its last day would be May 14, 2017: Our wonderful run is coming to an end. We have been faithfully serving food and booze in the Pearl for over 20 years, long before the boom of condos and apartments that is unfortunately pushing us out. We are working on finding a new location, but in the meantime, come down and see us while you can. We love you, and thanks for the two decades of love and support.

Reception
In an article about the restaurant's pending closure, Eater's Mattie John Bamman wrote, "With Touché, Portland loses one of the more unique nightlife opportunities in the city: a robust Italian restaurant and bar with an expansive, second-story billiards room atop a spiral staircase."

See also
 List of defunct restaurants of the United States
 List of Italian restaurants

References

External links

 
 

1995 establishments in Oregon
2017 disestablishments in Oregon
Defunct Italian restaurants in Portland, Oregon
Pearl District, Portland, Oregon
Restaurants disestablished in 2017
Restaurants established in 1995